The Latvian Individual Speedway Championship is an annual speedway event held since 1965 to determine the champion rider of Latvia.

Previous winners

Championships not held - 1967–1969, 1971–1975, 1981, 1989, 1996, 2002, 2009, 2016, 2021

References

Speedway in Latvia
National speedway championships